Caldicot may refer to:

 Caldicot, Buckinghamshire
 Caldicot, Monmouthshire
 Caldicot (hundred)
 Caldicot Castle, Monmouthshire
 Caldicot railway station, a part of the British railway system
 Caldicot RFC, a Welsh rugby union club
 Caldicot School, a coeducational and non-selective secondary school in Caldicot, Monmouthshire, South Wales

See also 
 Caldecote (disambiguation)
 Caldicott (disambiguation)
 Caldecott (disambiguation)
 Caldecotte, a district in the parish of Walton, Milton Keynes, in ceremonial Buckinghamshire, England